Pedro Javier Manzi Cruz (born 13 October 1988)  is a Uruguayan-born Spanish professional footballer who plays as a forward for I-League club Rajasthan United.

Career

Chennai City FC
In May 2018, he joined I-League club Chennai City.
On 26 October 2018, he made his debut for the club against Indian Arrows. He scored a hat-trick and led his side to a 4–1 home win. He has scored four hat-tricks in the 2018–19 I-League season for Chennai City. He also helped the team winning their first I-League title, and won the golden boot with 21 goals (jointly with Trinidadian Willis Plaza).

Albirex Niigata
In 2019, Manzi signed for Japanese J2 League side Albirex Niigata, where he played 8 league games and scored 2 goals.

Mohammedan Sporting
Manzi back to India in 2021, signing with I-League side Mohammedan Sporting. He debuted for the Black Panthers on 18 February against Aizawl FC.

Biratnagar City
On 14 April 2021, Manzi was announced as the first foreign signing of Biratnagar City FC who play in the newly created Nepal Super League.  He scored 4 goals in 6 games. The Spaniard was an instant fan favorite. He also won Super Player Of The Match against Butwal Lumbini F.C.

Bengaluru United
In August 2021, Manzi moved back to India and joined I-League 2nd Division side FC Bengaluru United and scored his first goal in a 1–0 win against Central Reserve Police Force at the 2021 Durand Cup in Kalyani. He scored four goals in the tournament, as their journey ended with a 4–2 defeat to Mohammedan Sporting in semi-finals.

Rajasthan United F.C
In January 2022, Manzi signed for I-League club Rajasthan United FC as free agent.

Career statistics

Club

Honours

Club
Chennai City FC
I-League: 2018–19

Individual
 2018–19 I-League Golden Boot (21 goals)

References

External links

Profile at La Preferente

Living people
1988 births
Spanish expatriate footballers
Spanish footballers
Association football forwards
Footballers from Montevideo
RCD Espanyol footballers
Universidad de Las Palmas CF footballers
UD Tijarafe players
Chennai City FC players
CE L'Hospitalet players
Marbella FC players
Albirex Niigata players
I-League players
J2 League players
Expatriate footballers in India
Expatriate footballers in Japan
Spanish expatriate sportspeople in India
Spanish expatriate sportspeople in Japan
Nepal Super League players
Rajasthan United FC players